Standpipe may refer to:

 Standpipe (firefighting), a rigid vertical or horizontal pipe to which fire hoses can be connected
 Standpipe (street), an external freestanding pipe to provide running water in areas with no other water supply
 Standpipe water towers
 Standpipe (plumbing), a vertical pipe attached to a p-trap for rapid high-volume wastewater drainage such as from washing machines
 Standpipe piezometer, a device that monitors groundwater levels through a borehole
 Rig standpipe, part of a drilling rig